The 2002–03 season was Feyenoord at 47th consecutive season playing in the Eredivisie, the top division of Dutch football.
Feyenoord finished 3rd in the 2002–03 Eredivisie and did qualified for the UEFA Cup. In the KNVB Cup they lost the final to FC Utrecht. In the 2002–03 UEFA Champions League Feyenoord was eliminated after the group stage.

Competitions

Eredivisie

League table

Results summary

Results by matchday

Matches

KNVB Cup

UEFA Super Cup

UEFA Champions League

Friendlies

Player details

|-
! colspan=14 style=background:#dcdcdc; text-align:center|Goalkeepers

|-
! colspan=14 style=background:#dcdcdc; text-align:center|Defenders

|-
! colspan=14 style=background:#dcdcdc; text-align:center|Midfielders

|-
! colspan=14 style=background:#dcdcdc; text-align:center|Forwards

Transfers

In:

Out:

Club

Coaching staff

Kit

|
|
|

References

Feyenoord seasons
Feyenoord